Spilarctia novaeguineae is a moth in the family Erebidae. It was described by Walter Rothschild in 1913. It is found in Papua New Guinea.

References

N
Endemic fauna of Papua New Guinea
Moths of Papua New Guinea
Moths described in 1913
Taxa named by Walter Rothschild